Countess Marie Karoline von Fuchs-Mollard (14 January 1675 – 27 April 1754), known as Charlotte, was the governess of Maria Theresa of Austria.

Early life
Born in Palais Mollard, Vienna to Count Franz Maximilian von Mollard (1621-1690), Vice-President of the Imperial Court Chamber and his second wife Katharina von Seeau. She had one half-brother from her father's previous marriage to Maria Katharina Thoman von Frankenberg (1630-1694), Count Ferdinand Ernst von Mollard (1648-1716), who served as President of the Imperial Court Chamber.

Imperial court
Marie Karoline came to the imperial court as lady-in-waiting of the future queen consort of Portugal, Maria Anna of Austria, the daughter of Leopold I, Holy Roman Emperor. 

Empress Elisabeth Christine entrusted the Countess with the education and upbringing of her daughter Maria Theresa, the heiress presumptive of the Habsburg dominions, when the girl was born in 1717. Countess Fuchs taught her etiquette and practically raised her. Maria Theresa developed a notably close relationship with Countess Fuchs.

When Maria Theresa succeeded her father as the ruler of Hungary, Bohemia and Austria, she gave Countess Fuchs a castle called Fuchsschlössl and made her a chatelaine.

Personal life
She married Count Christoph Ernst Fuchs von Bimbach und Dornheim (1664-1719) and had issue:
 Countess Maria Anna Charlotte Fuchs von Bimbach und Dornheim (died in 1768) ⚭ Count Johann Karl Martin Christoph von Nostitz-Rokitnitz (1673-1740); had issue who all died in infancy
 Count Johann Friedrich Fuchs vom Bimbach und Dornheim (27. February 1707-September 1707)
 Countess Maria Josepha Fuchs vom Bimbach und Dornheim (1711-1764) ⚭ Count Anton Christoph Karl Nostitz-Rieneck, who was her sisters son in law; no issue ⚭ Count Leopold Joseph von Daun, Prince of Teano; had issue
 Countess Maria Ernestina Rosalia Fuchs vom Bimbach und Dornheim (b. 1712)
 Maria Elisabeth Carolina Fuchs vom Bimbach und Dornheim (1715-1716)

Death
When Countess Fuchs died in Vienna in 1754, Maria Theresa ordered that she be buried in the Imperial Crypt. Thus, the Countess has the honour of being the only non-Habsburg buried in the Imperial Crypt. The 150th anniversary of her death was celebrated by a special Mass in the Capucin Crypt.

External links 
 REICHSGRÄFIN KAROLINE VON FUCHS-MOLLARD

1681 births
1754 deaths
18th-century Austrian people
Austrian ladies-in-waiting
Austrian countesses
People from Vienna
Governesses to Austrian royalty
Burials at the Imperial Crypt